Morattico is an unincorporated former post office town along the Rappahannock River in Lancaster County, Virginia, United States. It sits across Mulberry Creek from Belle Isle State Park. "Morattico" is an anglicized version of "Moraughtacund", the name of a Native American tribe whose primary village may have been on or near this site.

History 
The Moraughtacunds and their site were discovered by Captain John Smith in 1608. He would mediate a feud between the Moraughtacunds and their neighbors, the Rappahannock tribe. The Moraughtacund tribe moved further west by 1650.

In 1706, the site was deeded by Joseph Ball I, who originally purchased it in late 1698. He began building Morattico Plantation, also referred to as Morattico. In 1711, Joseph Ball I would die, and the plantation would be inherited by his son Joseph Ball II. However, the site would mainly be run by Joseph Chinn, Ball's nephew, due to Joseph Ball II's primary residence in England. After Joseph Ball II died in 1760, the plantation's ownership was transferred to his daughter, Frances Ravenscroft Ball Downman. Her son, Joseph Ball Downman would take over the site after her death in 1782. In 1799, James W.P Downman would inherit the plantation after his father, Joseph Ball Downman's death. Eventually, James W.P Downman would die at a young age in 1834, leaving neither an heir nor a will. In 1835, his surviving siblings petitioned to have Morattico Plantation to be divided into eight equal parts, which succeeded. From 1835 to 1845, George William Downman and Sarah Downman purchased most of the plantation. George William Downman would die at an unknown date, leaving his share to Sarah Downman, his sister. Littleton Downman Mitchell, Sarah's nephew, would inherit the plantation after her death in 1849. Around 1850, the original dwelling was dismantled by Downman himself. From 1864 to 1868, Downman lost his ownership of the site, and his creditors would purchase the plantation. Decades later, the 1933 Chesapeake–Potomac hurricane would reportedly cover the first floor of all buildings in the Morattico area except for the Morattico Plantation itself. L.C Thrift would then dismantle the plantation in 1935, using some materials from it to construct a two-story farmhouse.

The Village of Morattico Historic District was listed on the National Register of Historic Places in 2011.

Landmarks

Historical buildings 
The Morattico Waterfront Museum chronicles the history of Morattico and is located on the site of the original Morattico Wharf that operated from 1889 to 1933.

The Norwood Church was established in 1893 with the present church being built in 1897. It is located east of the local village and north side of Morattico Road. The denomination of the church is Baptist and it contains a cemetery.

Bodies of water 
Mulberry Creek is a -mile long tidal stream that enters the Rappahannock river around 26 miles above the river's mouth.

Morattico Creek is a body of water located in the town. Its name is thought to have originated from the second Morattico Indian Reservation.

Frog Pond is a swampy area located westside of Mulberry Creek Road. A well that provided water to many residents from the 18th century to the mid-20th century was located in its northwestern boundary.

Other 
Carpenter's Landing is an area used as a boat landing from both the early 19th century and early 20th century. It is located between the mouth of Mulberry Creek and the mouth of Raccoon Cove.

Raccoon Cove is a cove located on the north bank of Mulberry Creek.

References

External links
 Morattico Waterfront Museum

Unincorporated communities in Lancaster County, Virginia
Unincorporated communities in Virginia